Porathissery is a village in Irinjalakuda municipality Thrissur district in the state of Kerala, India.

Demographics
As of the 2011 Indian census, Porathissery had a population of 16,768 with 7,829 males and 8,939 females. There were 1,522 children below the age of 6.

Of the 16,768 people in Porathissery, 72.84% of the population were Hindu, 21.89% were Christian, 5.21% were Muslim, 0.02% stated other, and 0.04% did not provide their religion.

References

Villages in Mukundapuram Taluk